The Battle of Agri Pass (Albanian: Beteja e Qafës së Agrit) was a battle between Albanian rebels and Ottoman forces during the Revolt of 1910. The clash represented a military offensive launched by Shevket Turgut Pasha against Albanian rebels that were blocking the Agri Pass in the Bajrak of Nikaj-Mërtur. The Ottomans were defeated.

According to Albanian sources the Albanians rebels attacked 3,000 Ottomans  with 400-500 irregular soldiers. The Albanians suffered no casualties.

Background 
In 1910 the Young Turk Ottoman government imposed new centralization policies in Albania, which resulted in the Albanian revolt of 1910. The Rebels were supported by the Kingdom of Serbia. New taxes levied in the early months of 1910 led to Isa Boletini's activity to convince Albanian leaders who had already been involved in a 1909 uprising to try another revolt against the Ottoman Empire. The Albanian attacks on the Ottomans in Priştine (now Pristina) and Ferizovik (now Ferizaj), the killing of the Ottoman commander in İpek (now Peja), and the insurgents blocking of the railway to Skopje at the Kaçanik Pass led to the Ottoman government's declaration of martial law in the area.

Days before the Battle in the Agri Pass, the Albanians were defeated in the Battle of Morinë Pass, Battle of Carraleva Pass and Battle of Kaçanik Pass.

Aftermath 
Unable to repress their resistance in the Agri Pass, the Ottoman column took another way to Scutari, passing from the Pukë region. On July 24, 1910, Ottoman forces entered the city of Scutari (now known as Shkodër). During this period martial courts were put in action and summary executions took place. A large number of firearms were collected and many villages and properties were burned by the Ottoman army.

See also 

 Albanian revolt of 1912
 Malësor tribes revolt of 1917

References

Sources 

 
 
 
 
 
 
 
 
 

Military history of Albania
1910 in Albania
1910 in the Ottoman Empire
Agri Pass
Albanian Question
Agri Pass